Marc Robitaille (born June 7, 1976) is a Canadian former ice hockey goaltender who was an All-American for Northeastern.

Career
Robitaille bounced around in his junior career, playing for three separate teams, mostly as a backup. In his final year of eligibility, he received significant playing time with the Gloucester Rangers and posted strong numbers. He began attending Northeastern University the following year, serving as the Huskies starter as a freshman. In the program's first season under Bruce Crowder, Northeastern wasn't good and finished last in the Hockey East standings. The team saw a huge turnaround the following year and the team posted its first 20-win season in a decade. Robitaille was in net for each of those victories and lowered his goals against average by more than a goal per game. The massive swing to their success led the Toronto Maple Leafs to offer Robitaille a professional contract after the season. He jumped at the chance and ended his college career after being named an All-American.

In his first season with the Leafs, Robitaille was assigned to their AHL affiliate in St. John's. He split time in goal with two other netminders and while he did end up playing the most minutes, Robitaille did not distinguish himself as the top goalie on the team. His second season with the club turned out even worse and he watched most of the games from the bench after his GAA ballooned. Rather than continue his playing career, Robitaille retired after the season at the age of 23.

Robitaille returned home and began attending the University of Ottawa, graduating with a degree in business administration in 2003. He went on to work in the energy industry, mostly as a trader, spending nearly 12 years with Brookfield Renewable Partners.

Statistics

Regular season and playoffs

Awards and honors

References

External links

1976 births
Living people
AHCA Division I men's ice hockey All-Americans
Canadian ice hockey goaltenders
Ice hockey people from Ottawa
Northeastern Huskies men's ice hockey players
St. John's Maple Leafs players